For similarly named awards, see John Muir Award (disambiguation)
The Sierra Club John Muir Award was awarded annually by the Sierra Club.  It was the club's highest award.  According to the Sierra Club, "it honors a distinguished record of leadership in national conservation causes, such as continuing John Muir's work of preservation and establishment of parks and wildernesses."

Due to the Sierra Club's re-evaluation's of John Muir legacy in the context of racial justice, the John Muir Award was discontinued in 2020, after which the club's highest award was named the Changemaker of the Year Award starting in 2021.

Recipients of the John Muir Award
Source: Sierra Club awards page

1961 William Edward Colby
1962 Olaus Murie 
1963 Ansel Adams
1964 Walter A. Starr 
1965 Francis P. Farquhar
1966 Harold C. Bradley
1967 Sigurd F. Olson
1969 Henry M. Jackson
1970 George Marshall
1971 John P. Saylor
1972 Edgar Wayburn
1973 Richard M. Leonard
1974 John B. Oakes
1975 William O. Douglas
1976 Jacques Cousteau
1977 David R. Brower
1978 Phillip Berry
1979 J. Michael McCloskey
1980 Paul Ehrlich
1981 Brock Evans
1982 Wallace Stegner
1983 Margaret E. Murie
1984 Brant Calkin
1985 Denis A. Hayes
1986 Horace M. Albright
1987 John A. McComb
1988 John Seiberling
1989 Paul Brooks
1991 Celia Hunter
1992 James C. Catlin
1993 Martin Litton
1994 William E. Siri
1995 Joseph B. Fontaine
1996 Elden Hughes
1997 Doug Scott
1998 Jim Dodson
1999 Judy Anderson
2000 Carla Cloer
2001 Gaylord Nelson
2002 James Jeffords
2003 Vivian Newman
2004 Vicky Hoover
2005 Howard Booth
2006 Larry Melhalf
2007 Al Gore
2008 James E. Hansen
2009 Greg Haegele
2010 Dick Fiddler
2011 Bill McKibben
2012 Donald Parks
2013 Robert D. Bullard
2014 Terry Tempest Williams
2015 No award
2016 Tom Goldtooth
2017 Jane Goodall
2018 Yvon Chouinard

2019  Nadia Nazar, Varshini Prakash, Kelsey Juliana, Hernaliz Vazquez Torres, Joseph White Eyes

Recipients of the Changemaker of the Year Award

2021  Bernadette Demientieff
2022 Winona LaDuke

See also

 List of environmental awards 
 Prizes named after people

References

External links
 Sierra Club awards page

Environmental awards
Sierra Club
American awards
Awards established in 1961